The Leader of the Opposition in the Legislative Assembly of the Province of New Brunswick, Canada is a title traditionally held by the leader of the largest party not in government.

The leader of the Opposition is often seen as the alternative Premier to the present incumbent, and heads a rival alternative government known as the Shadow Cabinet or Opposition Front Bench.

List of opposition leaders 

A cohesive and consistent official opposition first formed when A. G. Blair formed the Liberal party in the early 1880s.  Previously oppositions occasionally organized over major issues such as anti-prohibitionists led by John Hamilton Gray in the mid-1850s, and pro-Confederationists under Charles Fisher in 1865-1866.

{| class="wikitable"
|-
! !! Name !! Party !! Took Office !! Left Office

Andrew G. BlairLiberal18791883
Daniel L. HaningtonConservative18831892
Alfred Augustus StocktonConservative18921899
John Douglas HazenConservative18991908
Clifford W. RobinsonLiberal19081912
Arthur Bliss CoppLiberal1912 1912
Louis-Auguste DugalLiberal1912 1917
James Alexander MurrayConservative19171920
John B. M. BaxterConservative1920<td>1921
<td>Charles D. Richards<td>Conservative<td>1921<td>1925
<td>Peter Veniot<td>Liberal<td>1925 <td>1926
<td>Allison Dysart<td>Liberal<td>1926 <td>1935
<td>Frederick C. Squires<td>Conservative<td>1935<td>1939
<td>Hugh Mackay<td>Progressive Conservative<td>1940<td>1948
<td>Hugh John Flemming<td>Progressive Conservative<td>1949<td>1952
<td>Austin Claude Taylor<td>Liberal<td>1952 <td>1957
<td>Joseph E. Connolly<td>Liberal<td>1957 <td>1958
<td>Louis Robichaud<td>Liberal<td>1958 <td>1960
<td>Hugh John Flemming<td>Progressive Conservative<td>1960<td>1960
<td>Cyril Sherwood<td>Progressive Conservative<td>1960<td>1966
<td>Charles Van Horne<td>Progressive Conservative<td>1967<td>1967
<td>Richard Hatfield<td>Progressive Conservative<td>1967<td>1970
<td>Louis Robichaud<td>Liberal<td>1970 <td>1971
<td>Robert Higgins<td>Liberal<td>1971 <td>1978
<td>Joseph Daigle<td>Liberal<td>1978<td>1981
<td>Doug Young<td>Liberal<td>1982<td>1983
<td>Ray Frenette<td>Liberal<td>1983<td>1985
<td>Shirley Dysart<td>Liberal<td>1985<td>1985
<td>Frank McKenna<td>Liberal<td>1985<td>1987
<td>Camille ThériaultLiberal19871991
[[Danny Cameron (politician)|Danny Cameron]]<td>[[New Brunswick Confederation of Regions Party|Confederation of Regions]]<td>1991<td>1995
{{Canadian party colour|NB|CoR|row}}<td>[[Ab Rector]]<td>[[New Brunswick Confederation of Regions Party|Confederation of Regions]]<td>1995<td>1995
{{Canadian party colour|NB|CoR|row}}<td>[[Greg Hargrove]]<td>[[New Brunswick Confederation of Regions Party|Confederation of Regions]]<td>1995<td>1995
{{Canadian party colour|NB|PC|row}}<td>[[Bernard Valcourt]]<td>[[New Brunswick Progressive Conservative Party|Progressive Conservative]]<td>1995<td>1997
{{Canadian party colour|NB|PC|row}}<td>[[Elvy Robichaud]]<td>[[New Brunswick Progressive Conservative Party|Progressive Conservative]]<td>1997<td>1998
{{Canadian party colour|NB|PC|row}}<td>[[Bernard Lord]]<td>[[New Brunswick Progressive Conservative Party|Progressive Conservative]]<td>1998<td>1999
{{Canadian party colour|NB|Liberal|row}}<td>[[Camille Theriault]]<td>[[New Brunswick Liberal Party|Liberal]]<td>1999<td>2001
{{Canadian party colour|NB|Liberal|row}}<td>[[Bernard Richard]]<td>[[New Brunswick Liberal Party|Liberal]]<td>2001<td>2002
{{Canadian party colour|NB|Liberal|row}}<td>[[Shawn Graham]]<td>[[New Brunswick Liberal Party|Liberal]]<td>2002<td>2006
{{Canadian party colour|NB|PC|row}}<td>[[Bernard Lord]]<td>[[New Brunswick Progressive Conservative Party|Progressive Conservative]]<td>2006<td>2007
{{Canadian party colour|NB|PC|row}}<td>[[Jeannot Volpé]]<td>[[New Brunswick Progressive Conservative Party|Progressive Conservative]]<td>2007<td>2008
{{Canadian party colour|NB|PC|row}}<td>[[David Alward]]<td>[[New Brunswick Progressive Conservative Party|Progressive Conservative]]<td>2008<td>2010
{{Canadian party colour|NB|Liberal|row}}<td>[[Victor Boudreau]]<td>[[New Brunswick Liberal Party|Liberal]]<td>2010<td>2013
{{Canadian party colour|NB|Liberal|row}}<td>[[Brian Gallant]]<td>[[New Brunswick Liberal Party|Liberal]]<td>2013<td>2014
{{Canadian party colour|NB|PC|row}}<td>[[Bruce Fitch]]<td>[[New Brunswick Progressive Conservative Party|Progressive Conservative]]<td>2014<td>2016
{{Canadian party colour|NB|PC|row}}<td>[[Blaine Higgs]]<td>[[New Brunswick Progressive Conservative Party|Progressive Conservative]]<td>2016<td>2018
{{Canadian party colour|NB|Liberal|row}}<td>[[Brian Gallant]]<td>[[New Brunswick Liberal Party|Liberal]]<td>2018<td>2019
{{Canadian party colour|NB|Liberal|row}}<td>[[Denis Landry]]<td>[[New Brunswick Liberal Party|Liberal]]<td>2019<td>2020
{{Canadian party colour|NB|Liberal|row}}<td>[[Roger Melanson]]<td>[[New Brunswick Liberal Party|Liberal]]<td>2020<td>2022
{{Canadian party colour|NB|Liberal|row}}<td>[[Rob McKee]]<td>[[New Brunswick Liberal Party|Liberal]]<td>2022<td>present
|}

Notes
{{reflist}}

See also 
 [[Leader of the Opposition (Alberta)]]
 [[Leader of the Opposition (British Columbia)]]
 [[Leader of the Opposition (Manitoba)]]
 [[Leader of the Opposition (Newfoundland and Labrador)]]
 [[Leader of the Opposition (Nova Scotia)]]
 [[Leader of the Opposition (Ontario)]]
 [[Leader of the Opposition (Prince Edward Island)]]
 [[List of leaders of the Official Opposition of Quebec|Leader of the Opposition (Quebec)]]
 [[Leader of the Opposition (Saskatchewan)]]
 [[List of Yukon Leaders of Opposition|Leader of the Opposition (Yukon Territory)]]
{{New Brunswick politics}}

[[Category:Politics of New Brunswick]]
[[Category:Opposition leaders in Canada|New Brunswick]]
[[Category:Lists of political office-holders in New Brunswick]]